Bracon Ash is a village and civil parish in the South Norfolk district of Norfolk, England.

History
Bracon Ash's name is of Anglo-Saxon origin and refers to a place with abundant bracken and ash.

In the Domesday Book, Bracon Ash is recorded as being made of 15 households which belonged to Roger Bigod.

Politics
According to the 2001 United Kingdom national census, the Bracon Ash and Hethel Parish covered an area of 9.84 km2 and had a population of 446 people, spread between 171 households.. The population at the 2011 census had increased to 460.

Places of Interest
St Nicholas Church, with no tower, is Grade 1 listed, like most other churches in South Norfolk, in the Domesday Book of 1086, with a church and a rectory.

Centered around the Grade II listed war memorial most of the amenities have been converted into housing including a Bakery, Post-Office, School.

England's smallest official nature reserve Hethel Thorn is accessed from the west of the village.

The children's play-park attracts visitors from the neighboring villages due to its excellent facilities and quiet location.

Bracon Ash Common is a small area of woodland and ponds running adjacent to Mergate Lane.

A public sculpture of 'Bracon Ash Village Sign' is located opposite the village hall. Designed by Jonathan Stevens as a project whilst studying at Wymondham College in 1994.

War Memorial
 Private Albert E. Chilestone (d.1916), 13th Battalion, Durham Light Infantry
 Private Arthur Canham (1898-1916), 8th Battalion, Royal Norfolk Regiment
 Private E. Dye (1895-1916), 8th Battalion, Royal Norfolk Regiment
 Private Arthur Devereux (1896-1915), 9th Battalion, Royal Norfolk Regiment
 Rifleman Wilfred R. Stackyard (1899-1918), 16th Battalion, King's Royal Rifle Corps
 E. Bunn
 G. Hammond
 J. Hammond
 B. Howlett
 F. Loveday
 F. Mallett
 H. Norman
 R. Peel
 W. Peel
 E. Smith

References

http://kepn.nottingham.ac.uk/map/place/Norfolk/Bracon%20Ash

External links

South Norfolk
Villages in Norfolk
Civil parishes in Norfolk